Clara Bellar (born 28 October 1972) is a French actress, singer, film director, screenwriter and film producer.

Filmography

Actress

Writer and director

Discography
 My Brazilian Heart (Meu Coração Brasileiro), debut album, released on 15 November 2006.
 My French Heart, released on 28 January 2013.

References

External links
Official website 

Official website Etre et devenir 
Official website Being and Becoming

1972 births
Living people
French women film directors
20th-century French actresses
21st-century French actresses
French television actresses
French film actresses
French stage actresses
French women screenwriters
French screenwriters
Film directors from Paris
French film producers
French women film producers
21st-century French singers
21st-century French women singers